The Bille tribe (Bile, Bille) of the Ijaw people lives in central Rivers State, Nigeria. Bille is one of the Ancient Ijaw Kingdoms in the Eastern Niger Delta region. The tribal seat is the town of Bille. Bille Town is the headquarters of the Ancient Bille Kingdom founded by Queen Ikpakiaba in the 9th century. It is a choice place for tourism because of its  rich unadulterated culture of the Ijaw people.  The people are friendly, accommodating and fun loving. Bille is one of the places on earth where the dignity of womanhood is upheld. Democracy is enshrined in its culture and therefore there is a practice of equal rights.

Location 
There are numerous settlements in the Bille territory, which combine with the Bille town to form the Bille kingdom. These are situated in various locations around the area that used to be under the control of the Bille people in the pre-colonial days. The Bille town is the major settlement in the kingdom, which served as the headquarters of the ancient Bille Empire.

Bille town, like other coastal towns, is a low-lying land in the vast mangrove forest region of the Niger Delta and is only a few feet above the sea level. It is situated in the south-eastern part of the present Degema Local Government Area of the Rivers State. It is an island on the bank of the Bille Creek, a tributary of the Sombrero River (Akuku  Toru). As an island, it was surrounded by water with a channel dividing it into two; hence, kala anga and opu anga, and thus one can drive round the town until in the late seventies when the southern axis - the Angula and Osia sections - was sand filled for expansion. The main land is now joined with the sand-filled area and extends into the mangrove forest, which is still being reclaimed.

Someone coming from Degema will sail along the Sombrero River southwards into the Opu Bille kubu creek and further southwards into the Kala Bille kubu opposite the Ibi Iriawo Anga settlement. After about 4 turns from the entrance of the Kala Bille kubu, the town is immediately sighted, welcoming you into its warm embrace.

A visitor from Port Harcourt can board a speedboat or any sea vessel at the various jetties but usually at the Bille waterside along the Creek Road, Port Harcourt. From there, the boat will sail southwards along numerous routes and later cross the New Calabar River within fifteen minutes from take-off and pass through the Awun Toru unto the Touma creek before entering the Oro kubu that runs to the shore of Bille. The new site (Iwo-ama) - a newly reclaimed mass of land - adjacent the town with school structures and playing fields is the first port of call. Thereafter, the boat will sail past the Green poku, Asuka poku, Abekereme poku and finally berth at the Sira poku where the first jetty is sited.

The Bille town has five basic entry points (all creeks), viz.; the Kala Bille kubu, the Besi kubu, which terminates at the Teinma (besi) boko or meinma anga opposite the Ibilan poku, the Oliyama anga, the Oro kubu and the Oruama boko. The Oliyama anga is the lower stream that starts from the Bille creek and leads to such southern places and towns as the Bille 1 Flow Station, Krikama, Gogoboama, Ekema, Ke, Kula, Abissa, etc.

Among the other major communities in the Bille kingdom where Bille people as well as fishermen and traders of various tribes reside include; Jikeama, Touma, Krikama, Ekema, Oruama, Oboma, Dikama Boko, Opu Bille Boko etc. although there are also numerous smaller villages used for  plantations. Some of these include: Makiridikianga, Sekiyabo-kurowa, Ele, Emannuel-kiri, Enesirama, Imopeleye ama, Ikpabiraba-daba, Dikama, Duroko, Ninama, Owu poku-obu, Feni-paan, Borma, Ibi-iriawo anga, Nonjuama, Madu-kiri, Amabiofiyema, Kari-ama, Epeka, Singi-kiri, etc. All these locations surround the Bille town, which is at the centre of the Bille kingdom.

In the 1935 Intelligent Report on the Bille Clan in the Degema Division of the Owerri Province, Captain Kelsey, the District Officer at the time said, "the inhabitants of Bille share rights of the rivers boundaries with Bonny only, commencing from the left side of Anwokiri-toru now known as New Calabar river which has its start (sic) from Anya creek."

In the same Report, Bille's fishing ports along the Anwokiri-toru and Bille Obu-toru were recorded to include "Tunduro bokobe kiri, Emmanuel kiri, Greenkiri or Feni-paan, Wosaba, Touma, Ekulekule-tombi and Dabira". Others were "Ibi iriawo angabe kiri, Kala-Bille bokobe kiri, Minji du kiri all in the Bille Kubu creek while along the Opu Bille boko there are the Opu Bille bokobe kiri and the Oruama bokobe kiri, Oruama kiri, Imopeleye bokobe kiri, Imopeleye, Eli kiri, Dokubo kiri, Dikama, Ogbodo piri, Ekema kiri, Balo bokobe kiri, and Torusira bokobe kiri."

The Report further identified rivers owned and controlled by Bille as Akuku Toru (Sombrero River) up to Ndele Toru, Obu Toru and the river stretching from Anwu Toru to the Anya creek.

The limit of the boundaries of the old kingdoms of Kalabari and Bille is described in paragraphs 117 and 118 of the 1949/50 Report of the Commission of Enquiry into the Okrika - Kalabari Dispute by Mr. Justice G. G. Robinson. The case for Bille is however very plain as in paragraph 118 where the Robinson Report described the boundaries of New Calabar (Kalabari) by adopting the Supreme Court of Nigeria decision on the issue. The facts are reproduced below:

118 So it is interesting to see what territory was given to the Kalabaris by the judgement (of the Supreme Court). It is as follows:

'I regard therefore all that territory from the Old Shipping extending to Bakana, Buguma and Abonnema (including Degema) and as far west as the Kula country occupied by the New Calabar people  over which they have exercised ownership for at least forty (40) years and which is now the territorial property of the chiefs and people of New Calabar as representing the people of New Calabar and this property includes all lands, banks of rivers, ponds and creeks and swamps and includes the New Calabar River and the Ekwe River and all its tributaries in the territory of which Old Shipping, Bakana, Buguma, Abonnema, Degema and Kula may be regarded as boundaries but excluding the country of the Billes who appear to have never lost their independence' (Emphasis mine)

This much was repeated in a memorandum submitted to the Rivers State Sub-Committee on Boundary Changes by Chief (Dr.) Harold J. Dappa-Biriye on October 10, 1997. In the memo, he further asserted that,

"The Billes who released Old Shipping to the Kalabari know that the middle of the New Calabar River is our (Bonny/Bille) boundary. This is evident in the map of Bille boundary tendered to the Mbanefo Inquiry Panel and forwarded here as well."

The people of Bille have maintained these locations and boundaries even in the colonial period in spite of the expansionist threats from her immediate neighbours and benefactors. The Bille territory is the area that has more oil and mineral deposits in the present Degema Local Government Area.

History 
Most writers from Bille place the founding of Bille in about the 9th century on the basis of tradition and linguistic research of other sister clans like Bonny. Others are more inclined to accept a date prior to the fourteenth century for which one can reliably adopt the 9th  century as the authentic period when the actual movement from the Benin Empire began.

Queen Ikpakiaba founded ancient Bille many centuries ago with several colleagues who fled their original settlement because of an internal conflict amongst the inhabitants. The people of Bille were said to have emigrated from the old Benin Empire. It is difficult to ascertain the accurate date from Oral tradition even as dates cannot be easily proven because of the difficulty in arriving at accurate data due to the level of knowledge about the calendar in those days.

Nonetheless, one will not equally be wrong to assert that a thriving and long established Bille community existed with its kings by the 15th century as recorded by early writers. According to Pacheco Pereira in the Esmeraldo de Situ Orbis (1505–1520), the Ijo people of Bille were already trading on slaves. Thus if by 1520 someone from Europe had written about a Bille community which was in slave trade, then one can conveniently proclaim that our Bille may have been established long ago before being strong enough to partake in such a serious and dangerous trade.

In addition, Jones (1963) refers to a raid in neighbouring Kalabari towns of slaves by Bille under King Agbaniye Jike. He equally referred to a Bonny tradition concerning the development of the slave trade under King Asimini, and the development of the Kalabari slave trade under the contemporary King Owerri Daba (Owereya Dappa). See Alagoa & Fombo 1972.

According to Smith, Robinson & K. Williamson in the 'Ijo Elements in Berbice Dutch', Owerri Daba is to be dated to roughly 1600. As indicated by Jones (1963), tradition assigns Agbaniye Jike of Bille to the same generation as Owerri Daba. On the basis of the above reference to Agbaniye Jike as a 17th-century warlord, we can draw inferences to the time of settlement of the first Bille people by adopting the age of Jike who is locally regarded as a 3rd generation Bille man. Jike was born to an already established kingdom with several past rulers before him. In fact, he belongs to the Opu Sira community and from the local permutations, he may have become great after several years under the tutelage of some great fighters even though he was said to have given signs of greatness at his birth.

We will therefore rely on the dates given by the early writers and put pressure on archaeologists to determine the possible period of the first settlement at Bille which will not only be acceptable to historians but will also agree with several artefacts in the community. In the meantime, we may have to rely only on the dates quoted by early local writers and the official position of Bille spokespersons at Tribunals and other public hearings.

We were told that they left the old Benin Empire and moved southwards to the Niger Delta region and first settled around the Tarakiri clan in Central Ijaw before finally settling at a place called Okolo Bille in the present Abua territory situated on the north of Degema on the bank of the Sombrero River. It was at this point that a severe dispute occurred amongst the inhabitants. Oral Tradition relates it to a dispute over the sharing of the head of a special fish called tilapia (atabila) by the rulers during a festival. This resulted in a civil war that caused most of them to emigrate to the south where they founded various towns and settlements.

Origin of Bille 
According to Oral tradition, when Queen Ikpakiaba the Amabinbo of Bille and her peers left Okolo Bille they first drove past an empty piece of land, which at that time was called Ogonobe Ingbetokuru. This is the present day Obuama in the Degema local Government Area. On the same route, they also sighted and passed a big forest (the present site of the Degema consulate) then known as Sukube Ingbetokuru. We are not so sure if there were people already settled at these settlements (they were regarded as barren lands not inhabited by people) as no mention was made of people they had met during their movements. Had they found any one then, the Bille people would have eliminated them on their route to the south of the area.

They later crossed the sea, passed by another big forest (present day Abonnema but then known as Mene), sailed downwards along the Sombrero River up to the entrance of the tributary called Oruama kubu, and sailed thereon. They later stopped at a small forest called Ikpabiraba Daba and stayed there for some days. The barren land is still there till today.

Considering that the place was too small and quite isolated, they left there and moved further along the route until they came to the Besi kubu creek through which they reached the present Bille town. It was then an island divided into two parts by a small channel with openings at two ends (the Opu Osia polo through the Opu Asa/Opu Okira axis). The channel - kroro -  is no longer dividing the town into two having been closed for over a century but there are marks of such a channel at the centre of the town and can be traced at the specific places where it transverse.

They entered the channel through the Opu Osia polo axis and moved into the centre of the town where they stopped to observe that some strange creatures were playing masquerades. These creatures later dived into a huge tunnel close to the centre of the town and disappeared. The creatures were later identified as water spirits, owama be apu. This puzzled Queen Ikpakiaba and peers so they left to disclose their new discovery to their people.

When they came the next time, they also saw the mermaids performing their rituals. They later disappeared into the well as they had earlier described to their people. The Bille people found out much later that the tunnel at the centre of the town was actually an under ground channel that ran from the centre of the town to the mouth of the Opu Bille kubu creek along the Sombrero River several kilometres from the town. This was confirmed by the appearance of persons who surfaced at the said place several days after they were drowned in the tunnel at the centre of Bille. That spot is where the present Bolo tree stands at the centre of the town.

On one of the occasional appearances of the mermaids, the early people of Bille negotiated with them to allow them (Bille people) to stay for seven years before they leave to settle elsewhere and they were permitted. Meanwhile, during this period the mermaids occasionally came out of the tunnel to display as they had done on that first day when the Queen first saw them.

When it was time for the Bille people to leave as earlier agreed, they kept on postponing their departure until the mermaids were tired of driving them. They had to leave the Bille people to stay there permanently. The mermaids then gradually reduced their periodic appearances for their regular masquerade displays until they finally stopped coming although they later came in the form of human beings as could be confirmed by the 'carrying' (or possession) of mermaid spirits by some women and the physical appearance of certain persons in the town. The queen and her colleagues were said to have made sacrifices to drive away the creatures before finally settling on the land.

The Bille people copied these displays and performed them regularly and these have become the bedrock of Bille's traditional heritage and a prominent feature of the Bille culture and tradition. The agiri festival has its origin from this discovery. It has, however, undergone numerous changes and innovations with time. The existence of such mermaids turned humans was confirmed by one of them - late Sibisonio Feniobu - who freely educated natives on their mode of operations when requested. He had named many of his peers who had come from their 'water' world because of the agiri festival. Unfortunately, most of them have died before the publication of this book.

Queen Ikpakiaba and her adherents thus settled on the land thereby ignoring the more spacious alternatives at the barren lands of the present day Obuama, Degema, and Abonnema, which she had seen but passed while on her route to Bille. She was indeed divinely led to the present land of Bille.

Emigration 

Opu Ogulaya and Opu Suma also emigrated from Akpata Bille and settled on a land now known as Ogoloma. After their settlement, Opu Otubeya, their kinsman, also settled on the other side of the same land. When at a later date both of them met in the bush they identified themselves as persons from the same root and thus proclaimed 'wakiri ke' meaning 'we are not different'. Thus, the place is known even until today as Wakirike although it has been anglicised to the word Okrika.

Some of those who also fled from the old settlement of the Bille people included Opu Okurukuru who founded the present day Kugbo while Opu Ikiya found Ikiakiama. Opu Ogini also left and settled on the land now called Oginiama while Opu Krobo also emigrated and settled on a land which is the present day Nkoro town in the Andoni Local Government Area. It has been confirmed that the people of Nkoro regard the eating of the tilapia fish as a taboo because of the historical significance.

Only recently, the people of Bille have discovered that there is also another place called Bille in northern Nigeria. On a maiden visit to the newfound land of Bille in Adamawa State of Nigeria between March 3 and 8, 2004, the Bille delegation comprising Chief O. G S. Digbani, Chief D. W. Herbert, Mr Ibim Watson Sanipe (representing the CDC), Ibinabo Thompson (representing the Bille Youths Federation) and Rev. Dr F. J. Igani was told that their forefathers actually travelled far north to settle at their present settlement and have over time become engulfed by the overbearing Hausa community. They claimed that their ancestors also migrated from a certain place called Bille because of a dispute over fish in the past but they were not sure of the original place they left. Incidentally, they have the same local names for such items as fish and water. The people also have the same names for the numbers as we have here in Bille.

According to recorded history, Bille was the sole power in the old Degema Division sharing boundaries then with other eastern Ijaw clans like Nembe, Bonny, and Okrika with whom she fought several wars. So great was her one time ruler, Agbani ye Jike, that the entire territory was under his influence although he conquered settlements without settling anybody for security reasons. It was the policy of the ancient people of Bille during Jike's era to eliminate all persons in the conquered territories and settlements leaving a barren land, which, unfortunately, had left Bille as a one-city kingdom. Gladly, life has begun in most of the other settlements especially at Jikeama, Touma etc. as we look forward to an ideal Bille kingdom.

Other towns that also claim an early existence including Ke, Idama and Kula were founded according to Oral Tradition by persons of Bille origin some of whom rebelled against the king and emigrated there and by Bille people dropped on such lands because of their abominable ailment. Kula was established by Opu Ada ye Sira of Sira Community in Bille. Agbaniye Kio, a brother of King Jike also left Bille when he had a dispute with his brother and settled on the land that is now known as Idama. In the Captain Kelsey Report of 1935, the claim of Bille over the town of Ke was recorded although because of the time lapse the Ke people now deny this claim, as the Bille people did not exercise authority over it for the obvious reasons that they were actually a neglected people cast out of Bille and were thus not prone to attacks from Bille or other aggressors.

They were all regarded as sister settlements and were thus never attacked by the Bille people. They were semi-autonomous in the period until in the later part of the last century when they sought and got the protection of the Kalabari king thus becoming a part of the Kalabari kingdom. This was a period of trading and European influence predating the colonial era when inter-tribal wars were on the decline and kings were not renowned for conquering territories but for their resistance against the European powers.

Relationship with other clans 

Several reasons have been adduced to explain why it was not possible for the people of Bille to move out of the present location to found new lands like her sister kingdoms. The chief reason is security, as the numerous wars and attacks from aggressors prevented persons from moving to settle on isolated islands and locations where they would be prone to severe attacks. They were only content with going out on fishing expeditions and coming back safe to Bille. Being a warring era, it was safer to stay in the hinterland where Bille town is situated as it took enemies much difficulty to drive through the creeks before reaching the town. In fact, before anybody could attempt such an attack on Bille he would have been subdued on his way by the ever-ready warriors who patrolled the creeks on a regular basis.

In addition, the ancient Bille people never trusted strangers as to settle natives amongst them on such conquered settlements for fear of uprisings and further enemy attacks. Therefore, Bille remained a safe haven for the great warriors of Bille in the Niger Delta region from the reign of King Agbani ye Jike until the advent of colonialism. To this day, because of his prowess and his sustenance of the Bille Empire in that period, the title of the Amanyanabo (king) of Bille is named after him.

One can also add that the near perfect living style of the Bille people whereby the extended family system allowed members of one family to share a single building equally contributed to the inability of people to move and settle elsewhere. In Bille, it is still possible for two brothers to share one building inherited from their father and both would always live together happily without molestation. This is absent in so many other communities as elder brothers have been reported to have chased away their younger ones and other relations from their inherited homes. This ordinarily would push one to seek elsewhere to find accommodation and had, in most cases, led people to develop barren lands to settle.

However, the most appropriate reason why the other clans have a relatively superior numerical strength is the large number of slaves bought and allowed to be members of those clans. In those days, noble men in places like Bonny and Kalabari were recognised by the number of slaves they kept. The slaves were later given freedom and made to belong to the families of their masters hence the growth in population of these clans. This much was confirmed by Ebiegberi J. Alagoa and Adadonye Fombo in their book, "A Chronicle of Grand Bonny", Ibadan University Press, published in 1972. Quoting Robin Horton's "From Fishing Village to City-state", the authors believed that 'whereas Elem Kalabari insisted on the complete acculturation of slaves to be integrated into the House System, Bonny does not seem to have full acculturation. Thus, although both states took part in the slave trade and absorbed large numbers of Ibo slaves into their communities, the Kalabari have preserved their language and culture, while Bonny has become bilingual in Igbo and Ibani. Thus, although the system of integration into the lineage or House System worked faultlessly in Bonny, the same policy was not pursued in the cultural field.'

Much of this though had to do with early exposure to persons from other tribes particularly the Europeans. Therefore, it was easy for noble men and chiefs from the neighbouring places to purchase slaves and give them freedom so that they help them in their new hinterland trade with the whites after slave trade was abolished. This was not the case in Bille even as intermarriage was relatively less between the Bille people and other clans. As a result, a proper census of the true natives in all the clans under reference will reveal that Bille has more genuine natives than all the other clans where people of mixed blood abound.

The need to expand the Bille Kingdom beyond the one-city status had in the past ten years invigorated the clamour for the development and transformation of the fishing settlements to the status of villages. This had resulted in the request for and approval of many such villages by the Bille Council of Chiefs. These new villages have also been recommended to the management of the SPDC for the purpose of establishing Community Development Committees and for membership of the Bille Youth Federation.

Settlement of Kalabari 
Originally settled at Elem Kalabari by the Bille people when they came from Duke Town in the present Akwa Ibom state, the Kalabari people have moved totally from there to found great cities, towns and villages with Buguma as the seat of their king. The old single towns have greatly evolved to become clans. Oral tradition and recorded history has it that one Mfon Manuel and a group of his people left Duke's Town and sailed down to Bonny where they met the king of Bonny. On hearing that they had fled from their former domain and are in search of a new settlement the Bonny monarch took them to his brother king at Bille and requested him to give him a portion of his vast territory for his guests. His exact words as recorded for posterity were, "kele pa imbari" literally meaning, 'please, give them some land' to settle. It is this initial expression that the Bille people later used in identifying their Duke Town strangers that had metamorphosed, over time, to become the name 'kalabari'.

This is the authentic history of the Kalabaris and any other version given and which does not tally with the Bille position is a fallacy because the people of Kalabari had referred all cases concerning the correct version of their history to the Bille people even in the early thirties. According to palace sources in Bille, made available to the Press team during the drafting of the memorandum submitted to the State Commission on the Kalabari / Bille Conflict, there are records of visits to Bille by some Kalabari chiefs to request the people of Bille to speak the truth concerning the rightful owners of the kingship of the Kalabari kingdom. Their visits were recorded in a minute-book kept by the Bille king for visitors. As a rule, the Secretary of the Council of Chiefs, usually a non-chief who was however literate, wrote the minutes for the chiefs in those days.
In one of the minutes of such meetings between the Kalabari visitors and the chiefs of Bille recorded on April 28, 1933 and written by the Secretary, late Mr A. O. Sibi (he later became a chief), a group of chiefs and people of Kalabari namely Chiefs Samuel Berriboyle, Ebenezer Don Pedro, Messrs. Obu Berriboyle, Tom Braide and Johnbull Yellowe came from Abonnema as representatives of the KALAGBEA House to inform the Amanyanabo and the chiefs of Bille about the dispute between the Kalagbea House and the Amachree House in Kalabari.

The Bille people present were Amanyanabo Igolima Dappa, Chiefs Abel Uriah, Efrenbo Nangi, Irionu, Joel Siala, Bruce Mgbe, Charles Sibi, Edward Bibi, Walter Bibi, Isaiah, etc.

Chief Ebenezer Don Pedro was the spokesman of the visiting Kalabari team. He explained to the Bille chiefs that they had come to inform them that the Kalabari nation had been split into two over the claim to the throne and kingship. He disclosed that the Amachree House had claimed to be the "supreme owners of the Kalabari land and that Amachree was the owner of the land as he was the first of all the kings". He went on to state the position of the Kalagbea House who insist that there had been others who ruled the nation (Kalabari) in succession before the advent of Amachree. According to the Kalagbea House, Amachree was a slave and there were about 14 to 15 kings before his arrival.

Their aim of coming to Bille, he further stated, was to inform the Bille people that they (the Kalagbea House) had told the District Officer (D.O.) that "there had been a people – Bille – who are the original owners of all this part – Delta Section – and that they are the only people in this part when they (the Kalabari people) came. And that these said people can identify the way and manner late Amachree came to the Kalabari land, and of the fact of the suzerainty of the predecessors who ruled the nation."

"That they should be consulted as to the fact of this. Besides the Bille, Bonny and Brass could corroborate too, but the Bille people are core of the facts" (sic).

He then disclosed that the D. O. had promised to come and interview the Bille people, and so they had come to intimate the chiefs of Bille of such an intended visit by the D. O.  As recorded by Mr Sibi (as he was then), the chiefs through late Bruce Mgbe thanked them for the visit and the kind sentiments expressed in owning up that the Bille people are the original owners or settlers of all these parts. He promised that the Bille people were ready to explain the truth to the D. O. whenever he comes.

On April 6, 1935, the Kalagbea House members came again to Bille to remind the Bille of their last visit. Only two persons came. They were Chief Stanley Don Pedro and Michael Romeo Georgewill both of Abonnema. At that time, the Secretary was late Mr (later Rev.) W. B. Herbert. They were received by King Igolima Dappa, Chief Isaiah Osinbo, Chief Abel Uriah, and Chief Joel Siala. Others were Messrs. Ebenezer Kari, Joseph Williams, Olu Jacob and Gilbert Bibi.

Towns and Villages in Bille Kingdom 

1)	JIKEAMA, 
2)	TOUMA, 
3)	ORUAMA, 
4)	IMOPELEAMA, 
5)	KRIKAMA, 
6)	KARIAMA 
7)	OPU BILLEBOKO, 
8)	ORUAMABOKO, 
9)	ENESIRAMA, 
10)	DIKAMA, 
11)	DEKAMABOKO,
12)	MAKIRIDIKIANGA, 
13)	MENJI-DUKIRI, 
14)	EGBEPIRI. 
15)	DABIRA
16)	BORMA
17)	AMABIOFIEMA
18)	OBOMA
19)	MADUAMA
20)	SEKIYABOKUROWA
21)	NINAMA
22)	KALATIRAMA
23)	EKEMA
24)	EMMANUELAMA
25)	FENIPAAN
26)	NONJUAMA
27)	OWUPOKU-OBU
28)	ELE
29)	IBI-IRIAWOAMA
30)	GOGOBOAMA, 
31)	DAPPAMA, 
32)	IBIA-AMA
33)	BEBEAMA 
34)	IBIDABOAMA
35)	IWOAMA
36)	IKPAKIABA AMA

References 

 
 

Ijaw
Indigenous peoples of Rivers State